The following highways are numbered 57:

Canada
 Alberta Highway 57 (defunct)
 Manitoba Highway 57
 Saskatchewan Highway 57

Czech Republic
 I/57 Highway; Czech: Silnice I/57

India
 National Highway 57 (India)

Mexico
 Mexican Federal Highway 57

Israel
 Highway 57 (Israel)

Italy
 Autostrada A57
Strada statale 57 del Vipacco e dell'Idria

Japan
 Japan National Route 57

Korea, South
Gukjido 57

New Zealand
 New Zealand State Highway 57

Philippines
 N57 highway (Philippines)

United Kingdom
 British A57 (Liverpool-Lincoln)
 British M57 (Liverpool)

United States
 Interstate 57
 U.S. Route 57
 Alabama State Route 57
 Arkansas Highway 57
 California State Route 57
 Colorado State Highway 57
 Connecticut Route 57
 Florida State Road 57
 Georgia State Route 57
 Idaho State Highway 57
 Illinois Route 57
 Indiana State Road 57
 Iowa Highway 57
 K-57 (Kansas highway)
 Kentucky Route 57
 Louisiana Highway 57
 Louisiana State Route 57 (former)
 Maryland Route 57
 Massachusetts Route 57
 M-57 (Michigan highway)
 Minnesota State Highway 57
 Mississippi Highway 57
Missouri Route 57 (1922) (former)
 Nebraska Highway 57
 Nebraska Spur 57A
 Nevada State Route 57 (former)
 New Jersey Route 57
 County Route 57 (Bergen County, New Jersey)
 County Route 57 (Monmouth County, New Jersey)
 New Mexico State Road 57
 New York State Route 57 (former)
 County Route 57 (Cattaraugus County, New York)
 County Route 57 (Chautauqua County, New York)
 County Route 57 (Clinton County, New York)
 County Route 57 (Dutchess County, New York)
 County Route 57 (Erie County, New York)
 County Route 57 (Jefferson County, New York)
 County Route 57 (Montgomery County, New York)
 County Route 57 (Niagara County, New York)
 County Route 57 (Onondaga County, New York)
 County Route 57A (Orleans County, New York)
 County Route 57 (Oswego County, New York)
 County Route 57A (Oswego County, New York)
 County Route 57 (Otsego County, New York)
 County Route 57 (Putnam County, New York)
 County Route 57 (Schoharie County, New York)
 County Route 57 (Suffolk County, New York)
 County Route 57A (Suffolk County, New York)
 County Route 57B (Suffolk County, New York)
 County Route 57 (Wyoming County, New York)
 North Carolina Highway 57
 North Dakota Highway 57
 Ohio State Route 57
 Pennsylvania Route 57 (former)
 South Carolina Highway 57
 Tennessee State Route 57
 Texas State Highway 57
 Texas State Highway Loop 57 (former)
 Texas State Highway Spur 57
 Farm to Market Road 57
 Texas Park Road 57
 Utah State Route 57
 Virginia State Route 57
 West Virginia Route 57
 Wisconsin Highway 57

See also
A57 § Roads